Ruhani Sharma is an Indian actress and model who primarily works in Telugu films. She made her acting debut in with the Tamil film Kadaisi Bench Karthi (2017) and received praise for her lead role in Chi La Sow (2018), marking her Telugu debut. 

Sharma then appeared in films like HIT: The First Case (2020) and Nootokka Jillala Andagadu (2021). In 2019, she made her Malayalam debut with Kamala.

Early life
Ruhani Sharma was born and brought up in Solan, Himachal Pradesh. Graduated from Punjab University, Chandigarh.

Career
Sharma first appeared in a Punjabi music videos "classroom" and "Kudi Tu Pataka" in 2013. . In 2018 she made her Telugu cinema debut in Chi La Sow, directed by Rahul Ravindran, and her performance was well received and praised. In 2019 she made her Malayalam debut in the thriller film Kamala written and directed by Ranjith Sankar.

She then appeared in Telugu films like HIT: The First Case and Dirty Hari in 2020 and also did Nootokka Jillala Andagadu in 2021.

She will next appear in the Telugu anthology film Meet Cute  and will be making her Hindi debut with Agra.

Filmography

Films

Web series

Music videos

References

External links 

 
 
 
 

Living people
Year of birth missing (living people)
Punjabi people
Actresses in Hindi cinema
Actresses in Malayalam cinema
Actresses in Punjabi cinema
Actresses in Tamil cinema
Actresses in Telugu cinema
21st-century Indian actresses